Da'Mari Scott (born August 8, 1995) is an American football wide receiver who is a free agent. He played college football at Fresno State.

Early years
Scott spent his early years in Muskegon, Michigan. As a teenager, he moved to Los Angeles, California, where he attended Cathedral High School. He made the move along with his sister, who was dating USC wide receiver Ronald Johnson, who is also from Muskegon.

College career
Scott caught 91 passes for 1,163 yards and five touchdowns and returned 73 kicks for 1,560 yards during his college career at Fresno State.

Professional career

Cleveland Browns
After going unselected in the 2018 NFL draft, Scott was signed as a free agent by the Cleveland Browns on May 4, 2018. He recorded eight catches during the 2018 preseason and was signed to the team's practice squad. He was promoted to the team's active roster on October 16, 2018. He was waived on December 1, 2018.

Buffalo Bills
On December 5, 2018, Scott was signed to the Buffalo Bills practice squad, and was promoted to the active roster three days later. He was waived on July 23, 2019.

New York Giants
On July 24, 2019, Scott was claimed off waivers by the New York Giants. He was waived on August 21, 2019. He was signed to the Giants practice squad on October 1, 2019. He was elevated to the active roster on November 27, 2019.

On August 2, 2020, Scott announced he would opt out of the 2020 season due to the COVID-19 pandemic. He was waived after the season on February 12, 2021.

References

External links
Buffalo Bills bio
Cleveland Browns bio
Fresno State Bulldogs bio

Living people
1995 births
People from Muskegon Heights, Michigan
Players of American football from Michigan
Players of American football from Los Angeles
Fresno State Bulldogs football players
Cleveland Browns players
Buffalo Bills players
New York Giants players